Jeffrey A. Kruse is a United States Air Force lieutenant general. He served as director of intelligence of the United States Indo-Pacific Command from July 2016 to July 2019, and was Director for Defense Intelligence (Warfighter Support) of the Office of the Under Secretary of Defense (Intelligence) from July 2019 to August 2020.

In July 2020, Kruse was nominated for promotion to lieutenant general and assignment as the director's advisor for military affairs of the Office of the Director of National Intelligence, a new office in the agency. He assumed this position on August 16, 2020.

Effective dates of promotions

References

Year of birth missing (living people)
Living people
Place of birth missing (living people)
Miami University alumni
National Intelligence University alumni
Naval War College alumni
National War College alumni
United States Air Force generals
Lieutenant generals